Susan Williams may refer to:

Susan May Williams (1812–1881), French princess
Susan Williams (artist) (?–2015), American artist
Sue Hamilton (actress) (1945–1969), American model and actress also known as Sue Williams
Susan Williams (swimmer) (born 1952), British Olympic swimmer
Susan Williams (historian) (born 1953), British historian
Susan Williams (marine biologist) (1951–2018), American marine biologist
Sue Williams (artist) (born 1956), Welsh visual artist
Susan Hoffman Williams (born 1960), American legal scholar
Susan Montgomery Williams (c. 1961–2008), American bubblegum-blower
Susan Williams, Baroness Williams of Trafford (born 1967), British politician, life peer
Susan Williams (triathlete) (born 1969), American triathlete
Sue Williams (painter) (born 1954), American artist
Suzy Williams (born 1953), American singer-songwriter
Susan Williams, a character in The Grudge (2004)